Canoeing at the 1976 Summer Olympics in Montreal, Quebec, Canada consisted of 11 events, all in canoe sprint,  held at the rowing basin on Notre Dame Island. The canoe slalom events introduced at the previous Games in Munich were not included in the Montreal program though four 500 m events for men were (C-1, C-2, K-1, and K-2).

Medal summary

Men's events

Women's events

Medal table

References
1976 Summer Olympics official report Volume 3. pp. 167–85. 

 
1976 Summer Olympics events
1976
Canoeing and kayaking competitions in Canada